Anton "Tony" Kaska (July 1, 1911 – August 9, 1994) was an American football fullback who played four seasons in the National Football League with the Detroit Lions and Brooklyn Dodgers. He played college football at Illinois Wesleyan University and attended Johnston City High School in Johnston City, Illinois.

References

External links
Just Sports Stats

1911 births
1994 deaths
Players of American football from Illinois
American football fullbacks
Illinois Wesleyan Titans football players
Detroit Lions players
Brooklyn Dodgers (NFL) players
People from Williamson County, Illinois